Valea Seacă is a commune in Iași County, Western Moldavia, Romania. It is composed of three villages: Conțești, Topile and Valea Seacă.

References

Communes in Iași County
Localities in Western Moldavia